The Itegue Taitu Hotel is a hotel in Addis Ababa, Ethiopia.

The Taitu Hotel was built in 1905 or 1906 (1898 in the Ethiopian calendar) in the middle of the city (Piazza), is the first hotel in Ethiopia. Taitu Betul (1851–1918), an Ethiopian Empress and the wife of Emperor Menelik II, established this hotel to provide foreign guests a place to rest and dine.

On January 11, 2015 a major fire broke out which caused damage on the historic Tayitu Hotel in Addis Ababa.

Notes

Hotels in Ethiopia
Buildings and structures in Addis Ababa